Lisa Marie Forrest (born 9 March 1964) is an Australian Commonwealth Games dual gold medalist in swimming. After retiring from competitive swimming she was a sports commentator, actor, reporter, writer, and media personality. She is married to Jesse Todd and has one son; Dexter Todd. Forrest appeared on the television talk show Beauty and the Beast and numerous other television shows, and is a 'celebrity' speaker. She is managed by Wall Media media management.

Sporting career 
Forrest trained with prominent coach Forbes Carlile and later with Terry Gathercole.

Commonwealth Games 

 1978 silver medal, 200 m backstroke, 1978 Commonwealth Games, Edmonton
 1982 gold medal, 100 m backstroke, 1982 Commonwealth Games, Brisbane
 1982 gold medal, 200 m backstroke, 1982 Commonwealth Games, Brisbane

Olympic Games 

At age 16 Forrest was the captain of the Australian swimming team at the 1980 Summer Olympics.

She was a finalist in the women's 4x100-metre medley relay in Swimming at the 1980 Summer Olympics in Moscow.

Writing

Forrest released her first novel, Making The Most Of It, in 2000. A work of fiction, it deals with the sport related problems of eating disorders, drugs, being a sporting celebrity, failure, self-esteem, and relationships. It was added to the recommended reading list for years 7–10 by the NSW Board of Studies.

She continued with fictional works: in 2002 djmAx; and in 2004 Meg Banana, an illustrated novel. In 2008 she published Boycott, a factual work of the story behind Australia's involvement in the 1980 Moscow Olympics. In 2013 she published Inheritance, another fictional work.

Honours 

Forrest received an Australian Sports Medal on 30 July 2000.

In 2001, she was inducted into the Northern Beaches Sporting Hall of Fame.

References

1964 births
Living people
Olympic swimmers of Australia
Australian female backstroke swimmers
Swimmers at the 1980 Summer Olympics
Commonwealth Games gold medallists for Australia
Commonwealth Games silver medallists for Australia
Swimmers at the 1982 Commonwealth Games
Swimmers at the 1978 Commonwealth Games
Commonwealth Games medallists in swimming
Medallists at the 1978 Commonwealth Games
Medallists at the 1982 Commonwealth Games